Ryan Metcalf (born 6 April 1993) is a Scottish former footballer who played for Dumbarton, as a midfielder.

References

1993 births
Living people
Scottish footballers
Dumbarton F.C. players
Scottish Football League players
Association football midfielders